The Battle of the House in the Horseshoe was a minor engagement during the American Revolution between loyalist militia under the command of David Fanning and patriot militia under the command of Phillip Alston, the owner of the House in the Horseshoe.  The battle, which took place on either July 29 or August 5, 1781 (with July 29 being the most accepted date), ended in a victory for the loyalists.  The surrender terms between the combatants were negotiated by Alston's wife on behalf of the patriots, and by Fanning for the loyalists.

References

External links
 North Carolina State Historic Sites page
North Carolina History Project, "House in the Horseshoe"

House in the Horseshoe
Moore County, North Carolina
House in the Horseshoe
1781 in North Carolina
the House in the Horseshoe